Arrhabaeus or  Arrhibaeus may refer to:

Arrhabaeus, the king of Lynkestis, who claimed Corinthian aristocratic (Bacchiadae) origin.  He revolted against his sovereign, king Perdiccas II of Macedon in 424 BC. Brasidas the Spartan helped Perdiccas against Arrhabaeus.
Arrhabaeus, son of Aeropus of Lyncestis, a conspirator against Philip II of Macedon. He was executed, along with his brother Heromenes.  His son Amyntas served as cavalry officer of Alexander the Great.
Arrhabaeus, a nobleman from Pelagonia, the father of Menelaus of Pelagonia.

References

Dictionary of Greek and Roman Biography and Mythology
Who's Who in the Age of Alexander the Great by Waldemar Heckel 

Ancient Lyncestians
People executed by Alexander the Great